Błędów Desert, is an area of sands between Błędów (part of Dąbrowa Górnicza in Upper Silesian Metropolitan Union) and the villages of Chechło and Klucze in Poland. The area lies mainly on the Silesian Highlands in the Lesser Poland Voivodeship. The Błędów Desert is Central Europe's largest accumulation of loose sand in an area away from any sea, deposited thousands of years ago by a melting glacier. The sands have an average depth of 40 m, up to 70 m at the maximum. The Biała Przemsza River divides the desert in two from east to west.

The Błędów Desert was not created naturally, but rather as a result of human activity which lowered the water table to such a degree that the ground could no longer support plant life. Beginning in the Middle Ages, area forests were aggressively cleared to meet the needs of local mining and metal working endeavors. This clearcutting exposed approx. 150 km2 of sand, which once reached as far south as Szczakowa.

According to legend, the desert was created by the Devil, who wanted to bury the nearby Olkusz silver mine in sand.

The desert was used as a military proving ground from the beginning of the 20th century. During the Second World War, the German Afrika Korps used the area to train soldiers and to test equipment before deployment in Africa. Military exercises continue in the area, including an airborne assault operation involving US, Canadian, and Polish forces in 2014.

In the centuries since its appearance, much of the Błędów Desert has been grown over. In 2013 and 2014 conservation efforts have restored some of the desert sands.

References

External links 

  Błędów Desert (to view the photo gallery, scroll down the page!)
 Wikimapia-Entry

Deserts of Poland
Deserts of Europe